Henry Allen was a Democratic member of the Wisconsin State Assembly during the 1848 session. Allen represented the 1st District of Washington County, Wisconsin.

References

People from Washington County, Wisconsin
Year of birth missing
Year of death missing
19th-century American politicians
Democratic Party members of the Wisconsin State Assembly